The 1993 Mediterranean Games football tournament was the 12th edition of the Mediterranean Games men's football tournament. The football tournament was held in Languedoc-Roussillon, France between 16 and 27 June 1993 as part of the 1993 Mediterranean Games and was contested by 10 teams. Countries were represented by their Olympic teams, except for host France, who took part with their U21 team. Turkey won the gold medal.

Participating teams
Ten Olympic teams took part in the tournament, 3 teams from Africa and 7 teams from Europe. France participated with the under-21 team.

Squads

Venues

Tournament
All times local : CET (UTC+1)

Group stage

Group A

Group B

Group C

Knockout stage

Semi-finals

Third place match

Final

Tournament classification

References

1993
Sports at the 1993 Mediterranean Games
1993 in African football
1993 in Asian football
1993